Michael D. Barone (born September 19, 1944) is an American conservative political analyst, historian, pundit and journalist. He is best known as the principal author of The Almanac of American Politics, a highly detailed reference work on Congress and state politics; it has been published biennially by National Journal since 1972. The Almanac has been called "definitive and essential for anyone writing seriously about campaigns and Congress." Barone is also a regular commentator on United States elections and political trends for the Fox News Channel.  In April 2009, Barone joined the Washington Examiner, leaving his position of 18 years at U.S. News & World Report.  He is based at the American Enterprise Institute as a resident fellow.  He has written several books on American political and demographic history.

Background 
Barone was born in Highland Park, Michigan, the son of Alice Katherine (née Darcy) and Charles Gerald "Jerry" Barone, MD, a surgeon. His father was of Italian descent and his mother of Irish descent. He graduated from Cranbrook School in 1962. He received a bachelor's degree from Harvard College in 1966 and a law degree from Yale Law School in 1969, where he was an editor of the Yale Law Journal.  After law school he clerked for Judge Wade H. McCree of the United States Court of Appeals for the Sixth Circuit.  Although he has been conservative as an adult, in the 1960s he worked as an intern for Jerome Cavanagh, the Democratic mayor of Detroit. He was also a supporter of George McGovern in 1972. In 1975 Barone married Joan Shorenstein. She died at age 38 in 1985 after a 10-year battle with cancer.

Political analyst 
Barone is a senior political analyst for the Washington Examiner, where he writes a twice weekly column and contributes to the newspaper's blog. His column is syndicated by Creators Syndicate. He is also a frequent contributor during Fox News Channel's election coverage.  His political views are preedominantly conservative.  Barone has said he is not religious, although he is sympathetic to and respectful of social conservatives.

His commentary has largely focused the topic of immigration. Perhaps partly as a result of being a descendant of Italian immigrants, Barone takes an optimistic view of contemporary immigration into the US. He says that Hispanic immigration has parallels to the Italian experience and that, given the right circumstances, current and future Hispanic and other immigrants can become Americanized and assimilated, just as the Italians were.
 Columnist, Townhall.com, 2001–present
 Senior political analyst, Washington Examiner, 2009–present
 Senior writer, U.S. News & World Report, Washington, 1989–1996, 1998–departure
 Senior staff editor, Reader's Digest, Washington, 1996–1998
 editorial writer and  columnist, The Washington Post, 1981–1988
 Vice president, Peter D. Hart Research Co., Washington, 1974–81
 Law clerk to Judge Wade H. McCree, Jr., U.S. 6th Circuit Court of Appeals, Detroit, 1969–71

In November 2008, Barone said journalists criticized Republican vice presidential nominee Sarah Palin because "she did not abort her Down syndrome baby." Barone later said he was "attempting to be humorous and ... went over the line."

Barone has been covered the 2020 presidential election, writing numerous opinion columns on the race for the  Examiner. Barone argues in 2020 that national presidential nominating conventions are no longer needed or useful. He welcomes their replacement by virtual conventions with minimal participation. They were useful before the advent of television in 1952, he says: 
 National conventions no longer serve their original purpose, or the uses the parties and the press have made of them in the past half-century. The national conventions were, for their first 130 years, a unique communications medium. They were the only place and time where party politicians could communicate frankly and bargain personally. They were the only place where people could discover which candidates had genuine support and which just gave lip service.

Writings

He is the author of several books:
 Our Country: The Shaping of America from Roosevelt to Reagan (Free Press, 1990)
 The New Americans: How the Melting Pot can work Again (Regnery Publishing, 2001)
 Hard America, Soft America: Competition vs. Coddling and the Battle for the Nation's Future (Crown Forum, 2004)
 Our First Revolution: The Remarkable British Upheaval that Inspired America's Founding Fathers (Crown Publishers, 2007), a popular history of the Glorious Revolution of 1688 and how it led to the American Revolution.
 principal co-author, The Almanac of American Politics,  (published biennially 1972–)
 The New Americans: How the Melting Pot Can Work Again (Regnery Publishing, 2012)
 Shaping Our Nation: How Surges of Migration Transformed America and Its Politics (Growth Forum, 2013)
 How America’s Political Parties Change (and How They Don’t) (Encounter Books, 2019)

References

External links 
 Michael Barone's Opinion Articles at Creators Syndicate
 Washington Examiner
 Barone's Examiner archives
 
 In Depth interview with Barone, July 1, 2007
 Beltway Confidential
 Archive of his U.S. News & World Report columns
  Podcasts of Barone's articles
 
 with Michael Barone by Stephen McKiernan, Binghamton University Libraries Center for the Study of the 1960s, June 29, 2010

American columnists
American political commentators
Cranbrook Educational Community alumni
Yale Law School alumni
Harvard College alumni
Living people
American Enterprise Institute
1944 births
People from Highland Park, Michigan
American male journalists
Journalists from Michigan
The Washington Post columnists
Fox News people
American people of Italian descent
American people of Irish descent
The Harvard Crimson people
Shorenstein family